or  (literally: Bell River) is a river in Nordland county, Norway. It flows from the lake Nordre Bjøllåvatnet in Saltdal Municipality, through the valley of Bjøllådalen in the Saltfjellet mountains, within the Saltfjellet–Svartisen National Park, and joins with the river Ranelva in Rana Municipality.

References

Rivers of Nordland
Rana, Norway
Saltdal
Rivers of Norway